Hibbitt is a surname. Notable people with the surname include:

Kenny Hibbitt (born 1951), English footballer and manager
Larry Hibbitt, English songwriter and record producer
Terry Hibbitt (1947–1994), English footballer and manager

See also
Hibbett